Shershah Syed (born March 26, 1953) is a Pakistani physician and surgeon, known for his work in obstetrics and maternal health.  He was involved in providing emergency medical assistance to victims of the 2010 Pakistan floods. He was the President of the Society of Obstetricians & Gynecologists of Pakistan from 2007 to 2010, He is the current President of the International Society of Fistula Surgeons (ISOFS) and also the Pakistan National Forum on Women's Health (PNFWH).

Personal life 
His parents migrated from Bihar, India. He has two brothers and five sisters.  All have become doctors and all their spouses and most of their children are doctors as well.

His father Syed Abuzafar Azad, a teacher by profession, was the founder/head master & of Ghazi Mohammad Bin Qasim School in the Liari district of Karachi. Having a Maters in Islamic History he dedicated his entire life to promoting education, particularly for girls. His social work revolved around education and was greatly respected and very popular among his students and colleagues.

His mother Dr. Atia Zafar attained her MBBS after doing a course of Alim-fazil. She was a voracious reader and had an excellent command on Urdu language and literature, with Iqbal being amongst her favorite poets. She was a very good physician with a large number of devoted patients.

His wife Dr. Tayyaba Fatema Shah is pediatrician and lives in Atlanta, USA, daughter Zaria Atia Shah is studying in school.

Professional History 
After MBBS from Dow Medical College University of Karachi he proceeded to the UK and trained and worked in Ireland to become an obstetrician and gynecologist. He attained an MRCOG before returning to Pakistan where he started working for the Government of Sindh and was posted as assistant professor at Dow Medical College, Karachi, his alma mater.

He subsequently joined Kishan Devi Chetumal Sobhraj Maternity Home as MS. In the five years spent there he brought many advancements in the institution.  After a short stint at the Nawabshah Medical College he joined the Qatar Hospital in Orangi Town, a very populous yet underprivileged community where he left behind a permanent footprint with the expansion and advancement in the Obstetric and Gynecology Department.

Pakistan Medical Association 
Dr. Shershah was elected as general secretary of Pakistan Medical Association, Karachi and remained in that portfolio for six years and then Secretary General of PMA center.  As an active member of PMA, he has continually advised the government on ways to improve the health care system in the country and for which he has traveled to every district of Pakistan during this period.

PMDC - Pakistan Medical Dental Council 
He was also elected as member of Pakistan Medical Dental Council.

Society of Obstetrician and Gynecologists Pakistan (SOGP) 
Dr. Shershah was elected as president of Society of Obstetrician and Gynecologists Pakistan (SOGP) for three years during which time he played a great role in reorganizing the post-graduate training program in Obstetrics and Gynecology.

International Society of Fistula Surgeons (ISOFS) 
He is elected as President of the International Society of Fistula Surgeons (ISOFS) at a conference held at Nigeria.  In that capacity he has been organizing surgical camps for fistula patients.  In 2019 he ran the Istanbul Marathon to raise funds for Fistula Foundation of California.

Director of Women’s Right 
Life and Health Project of Government in  collaboration with UNICEF, Columbia University and Johns Hopkins University, USA to provide EmOC in city slums and rural Sindh.

Fellowship and Awards 
RCOG traveling award to work at FISTULA Hospital, Addis Ababa, Ethiopia 1994

RCOG Menopause Award 1996 to attend a meeting in London and to work with Dr. John Studd's menopause clinic

Clinton Global Initiative guest invited by President Clinton in New York in November 2009 

FIGO (Federation of Obstetrica Gynaecologica) Distinguish Community Obstetrician award received in 2003 at Santiago Chile.

Pride of Karachi Award by K-Electric in 2014

Sheikh Hamdan Bin Rashid Al Maktoum Award 2012 for the treatment of genital tract fistula and rehabilitation of fistula victims

Nomination among 100 most inspiring individuals delivering for girls and women by Women Deliver in 2011

Humanitarian / Philanthropic Activities 
After receiving training in the treatment of infertility, on his return to Pakistan he was overwhelmed seeing the plight of women in the country. For the first time in his practice he encountered pregnant women dying in great numbers due to avoidable causes and noticed that more than six hundred thousand women were having complications because of pregnancy, like Fistula. This depressed him changed his entire concept of practice and he lost interest in infertility and started working to prevent maternal death and suffering of women.  He also realized that young girls were also suffering badly and they were forcefully married when they are merely children. Girls were being murdered by their family members on the name of honor killing.  He started working against violence against women with UNICEF and UNFPA.

Realizing that the maternal death rate cannot be decreased without providing care to pregnant women and that will be only possible by training of midwives, with the help of UNICEF he established a number of new schools of midwifery in different parts of country.

Creating a Great Resource for Midwifery 
Realizing that no books on midwifery were available in the vernacular which seriously hampered teaching, in collaboration with a group of Journalists in Karachi Dr. Shershah started translating midwifery books in to Urdu and Sindhi.  In record time 13 different books, averaging over 400 pages each on midwifery and nursing were translated from English to Urdu and Sindhi which was a great achievement, thus creating a great resource available for teaching in the local languages.  A task of this dimension is usually achieved through Government support; however this was conducted by merely a handful of friends and family.  Results are already showing that these large number of trained midwives will play a vital role in the prevention of maternal morbidity, mortality and prevention of fistula.

Books - Medical and Literary Publications 
He has regularly writing in the DAWN the largest circulating English newspaper on issues related to medical education and the health care system in Pakistan.

He wrote his first short story when he attended the Jamia Milia school in Malir, Karachi. His second story "NAI DUNYA" نئی دنیا " was published in the magazine of Jamia Milia college. His third story AZADI KA MUJUSSAMA - آزادی کا مجسمہ was published in PAKISTANI ADAB when he was studying at Dow Medical College.

While at Dow Medical College he published two novels:

 Chimniyan Jall Uth Gaen - چمنیاں جل اٹھ گئیں
 Laho Laho Zabanain - لہو لہو زبانیں

After break of several years and on returning to Pakistan he resumed writing and has published Twelve collections of short stories comprising nearly two hundred stories. He has also published a collection of children’s stories, translated from many different countries named “Dais Dais Ki Khanian”  دیس دیس کی کہانیاں –  a small story book for children.

He has also authored and published a collection of four books :-

1.     ILMO AGAHIE KA SAFAR –  علم و آگہی کا سفر – A history of universities.

2.     AGAHIE KAI CHIRAGH –  آگہی کے چراغ – A history of libraries.

3.     AGAHIE KAI NISHAN –  آگہی کے نشان – A history of museums.

4.     AMRAZ SAE AGAHIE OR HISPATALON KI TAREKH – امراض سے آگہی اور ھسپتالوں کی تاریخ – A history of hospitals and disease.

Biography 
He also wrote a biography of his parents in English called VISION – which has been translated into Urdu and Sindhi languages as well.

 Vision - Not just a dream
 اردو ترجمہ - وہ صورت گر کچھ خوابوں کا  
 سندھی ترجمہ - سپنن جو سر جٹھار 
 Books for Children 
زندگی کے رنگ  - بچوں کی دلچسپ نظمیں   *

دیس دیس کی کہانیاں   *

 Novel - Urdu 
غبار   *

 Books of Short Stories 
دل کی وہی تنہائی   *

جس کو دل کہتے تھے   *

دل ہی تو ہے   *

دل کی بساط   *

چاک ہوا دل   *

دل میرا بالا کوٹ   *

دل ہے داغ داغ   *

کون دلاں دیاں جانے   *

دل نے کہا نہیں   *

فسانہ دل کا   *

دل ریزہ ریزہ   *

جو دل نکلے تو دم نکلے   *

تو میرا دل بنا دیا   *

Medical Publications 
Gynecological Oncology, Sadiqa Jaffery, Shershah Syed

Textbook for Midwifery (Urdu)

Emergency Obstetrical Care for Midwives (Urdu)

Emergency Obstetrical Care for Family Physicians

Where Women has no Doctor (Urdu)

Easy Midwifery (Urdu) translation of Hesperian foundation publication.

Midwifery Pictorial.

How to teach nursing (Urdu). A book for nursing tutors.

Teaching Midwifery (Urdu). A book for midwifery tutors.

Teaching paramedics and O.T. Technicians (Urdu).

A health hand book for women with disability (Urdu). Hesperian foundation Publication.

Where there is no doctor (Urdu). Hesperian foundation publication.

Interest 
Safe Motherhood, Training of Midwives and Provision of EmOC in rural setup.

Vesico-Vaginal and Recto-Vaginal Fistulas

Infertility, Gynaecological Endocrinology and Oncology.

Long distance Marathon runner

Founder member of Amnesty International Pakistan.

Founder member of Society of Prevention of abuse against animals

Member of War Against Rape

Radio 
He does a weekly radio program on FM105 called IMO AGAHIE KA SAFAR every Sunday to create awareness in fields like science, literature history and philosophy.

References

Living people
Pakistani surgeons
Pakistani obstetricians
Pakistani gynaecologists
People from Karachi
Writers from Karachi
1953 births